The Machangulo peninsula is situated in the southernmost part of Mozambique adjacent to Inhaca and Portuguese Islands in the Maputo Bay.

Peninsulas of Mozambique